The carbonate oxalates are mixed anion compounds that contain both carbonate (CO3) and oxalate (C2O4) anions. Most compounds incorporate large trivalent metal ions, such as the rare earth elements. Some carbonate oxalate compounds of variable composition are formed by heating oxalates.

Formation
One method to form carbonate oxalates is to heat a metal salt with ascorbic acid, which decomposes to oxalate and carbonate and combines with the metal.

Reactions
When heated, oxalate carbonates decompose to carbon monoxide and carbonates, which form oxides at higher temperatures.

List

References

Carbonates
Mixed anion compounds
Oxalates